21 Camelopardalis is a star in the northern circumpolar constellation of Camelopardalis, located around 650 light years away from the Sun. It is a challenge to view with the naked eye even under excellent viewing conditions, having an apparent visual magnitude of 6.9. This is one of the fainter stars with a Flamsteed designation, one of only 220 below the magnitude cutoff for the Bright Star Catalogue. It is moving closer to the Earth with a heliocentric radial velocity of −15.5 km/s.

The spectral type for 21 Camelopardalis is given only as A5 with no published luminosity class. It is treated as a normal main sequence star, although it is calculated to be larger and more luminous than a typical A5 main sequence star. Based upon changes to its proper motion over time, this is a probable astrometric binary.

References

A-type main-sequence stars
Camelopardalis (constellation)
Durchmusterung objects
Camelopardalis, 21
037136
026700